The Express & Star is a regional evening newspaper in Britain. Founded in 1889, it is based in Wolverhampton, England, and covers the West Midlands county and Staffordshire.

Currently edited by Martin Wright, the Express & Star publishes six editions a week between Monday and Saturday. In 2007 the newspaper had a daily circulation of 174,989 by June 2014 it was 73,473,  then 55,373 in 2016, 38,690 in 2019  and by 2021 was 19,683.

In 2022 figures from JICREG (Joint industry Currency for Regional Media Research) show that 17,973 papers are printed each day and there are 51,403 readers. Online expressandstar.com has 1.64 million monthly unique users with 8.9 million monthly page views.

The Express & Star features a mixture of regional and national news and has a strong following for its sports coverage of association football, particularly local teams Wolverhampton Wanderers, Walsall, and West Bromwich Albion.

The Express & Star is one of the few independent newspapers still operating in the UK, having been under the continuous ownership of the Graham family almost since its inception. It is owned by the Midland News Association (MNA), which also owns the Shropshire Star newspaper.

In January 2013 editor Adrian Faber announced his decision to step down after 11 years at the Express & Star. He was replaced by Shropshire Star editor Keith Harrison in April 2013, who remained at the helm until leaving the newspaper late in 2018.

Harrison was replaced by Shropshire Star editor Martin Wright, who became Midland News Association editor-in-chief, editing both the Express & Star and Shropshire Star

History

The origins of the Express & Star lie in the Evening Star – a liberal newspaper founded in Wolverhampton in 1880 as a rival to the existing conservative Evening Express, itself founded in 1874. In 1882 the Star was bought by wealthy Scottish-American philanthropist Andrew Carnegie, encouraged by his friend and fellow Dunfermline-born liberal (and by then prominent Wolverhampton councillor) Thomas Graham.

The combination of Carnegie's finance and Graham's organisational ability saw the paper flourish and within two years the Star had taken over the Express under the editorship of another Dunfermline native, editor Andrew Meikle. The combined newspaper adopted its current name in 1889.

Carnegie severed his links with the paper and its parent company the Midland News Association in 1902, leaving Graham in full control until his death in 1909. The following decades saw a steady expansion under Graham's descendants, with the paper's influence spreading out from its native Wolverhampton to cover the entire Black Country. An office in Birmingham was opened and later closed.

The 21st century saw a drop in circulation and advertising revenues, in common with most other newspapers, leading to the company shedding around 50 jobs through a voluntary redundancy scheme in April 2006, with further cuts announced in January 2007. Printing plants in West Bromwich, Wolverhampton and Ketley, Telford were closed in 2009, 2011 and 2021. Now the Express & Star is printed by Newsquest at their Deeside office.

In April 2011 the Express & Star introduced paid-for access to selected online content – including photo galleries, football match analysis and traffic and travel –
under the banner of Express & Star 24. A print, online and smartphone package was offered for £2.34 a week, which included delivery of the newspaper. However, the paywall was scrapped after just nine months. The digital edition of the Express & Star was re-launched in 2021 and allows readers to access news, sport and analysis on their mobile or tablet.

Online media
The Express & Star publishes breaking news and sport content online each day, in addition to regular blogs and unique video content. Its website expressandstar.com was launched in 1997. It is the fastest growing website among the leading regional publishers, with 1.64 million monthly unique users and 8.9 million monthly page views.

August 2012 saw the website re-launched in a responsive web design alongside its sister title shropshirestar.com – believed to be the first of any other regional newspaper websites in the UK.

An Express & Star App for iPad and iPhone was launched in January 2012, using page-turning technology to mimic the look and feel of the actual newspaper. Further apps for Android and Kindle Fire were released in February 2013.

The website also offers free access to the weekly Chronicle series.

Leveson Inquiry
On 20 March 2012 Express & Star former editor Adrian Faber appeared as a witness at the Leveson Inquiry into Press standards. He told the inquiry that regional newspapers are different from national titles, relying far more on trust. Mr Faber said the Express & Star had never hacked a mobile phone, never paid a public official for a story and saw trust as integral to its role.

Awards
The Express & Star was awarded Midland Newspaper of the Year in 2012 by the Midlands Media Awards.

The Express & Star was awarded Daily/Sunday newspaper of the year (above 25,000) at the Regional Press Awards for 2013.

Editors
 Martin Wright (2018–present)
 Keith Harrison (2013–2018) 
 Adrian Faber (2002–2013) 
 Warren Wilson (1995–2002)
 Keith Parker (1977–1995)
 Mark Kersen (?-?)
 Clement Jones (1960–1970)
 Andrew Meikle (1885–1922)

Notable former contributors 
 Boris Johnson did work experience at the Express & Star when he was a trainee journalist on The Times in the 1980s. 
 Broadcaster Sybil Ruscoe began her reporting career at the Express & Star.
 Jeremy Clarkson wrote for the Express & Star as well as its sister paper the Shropshire Star, which he says launched his career as a motoring columnist.

Editions
Staffordshire
Stafford and Stone
Walsall
Sandwell
Dudley and Wyre Forest
City (Wolverhampton)
A weekly Express & Star edition in Kidderminster was launched in October 2012 to replace the Kidderminster Chronicle.

See also
Shropshire Star
Midland News Association

References

External links
Official website

1889 establishments in England
Daily newspapers published in the United Kingdom
Mass media in Wolverhampton
Newspapers published in the West Midlands (county)
Newspapers established in 1889